Pyotr or Petr Yakovlevich Chaadayev (also spelled Chaadaev, or Čaadajev; 7 June [27 May Old Style] 1794 – 26 April [14 April O.S.] 1856) was a Russian philosopher. He was one of the Russian Schellingians.

Chaadayev wrote eight "Philosophical Letters" about Russia in French between 1826 and 1831, which circulated among intellectuals in Russia in manuscript form for many years. They comprise an indictment of Russian culture for its laggard role far behind the leaders of Western civilization. He cast doubt on the greatness of the Russian past, and ridiculed Orthodoxy  for failing to provide a sound spiritual basis for the Russian mind. He extolled the achievements of Europe, especially in rational and logical thought, its progressive spirit, its leadership in science, and indeed its leadership on the path to freedom. The Russian government saw his ideas as dangerous and unsound. After some were published, they were all banned by the censorship process. Because there was nothing to charge him with, Chaadayev was declared legally insane and put under constant medical supervision, though this was a formality rather than a real administrative abuse.

Biography 
Chaadayev was born and died in Moscow. The familty name of the  probably derives from the Turkic word Chaʿadai, with the name deriving from  Chagatay, the second son of Genghis Khan. (The Mongol name Chagatay means "bold", "honourable" or "true".)
After leaving Moscow University without completing his course in 1812, he entered the army and fought against the 1812 French invasion of Russia. 
From 1823 to 1826 he travelled in Europe, so he was out of Russia during the 1825  Decembrist insurrection, though he was questioned on his return about his connections with many of the Decembrists. These connections may have contributed to his failure to find a position in the new administration of Emperor Nicholas I.

Chaadayev befriended Alexander Pushkin (1799-1837) and became a model for  Chatsky, the chief protagonist of Alexander Griboyedov's play Woe from Wit (1824). During the 1840s Chaadayev was an active participant in Moscow literary circles.

Philosophy
The main thesis of his famous Philosophical Letters was that Russia had lagged behind Western countries and had contributed nothing to the world's progress and concluded that Russia must start de novo. As a result, they included criticism of Russia's intellectual isolation and social backwardness.

When in 1836 the first edition (and only one published during his life) of the philosophical letters was published in the Russian magazine Telescope, its editor was exiled to the Far North of Russia. The Slavophiles at first mistook Chaadayev for one of them, but later, on realizing their mistake, bitterly denounced and disclaimed him. Chaadayev fought Slavophilism all of his life. His first Philosophical Letter has been labeled the "opening shot" of the Westernizer-Slavophile controversy which was dominant in Russian social thought of the nineteenth century. He wrote in his "first letter":

The strikingly uncomplimentary views of Russia in the first philosophical letter caused their author to be declared "clinically insane" because he criticized the regime of Tsar Nicholas I. The 1836 case of Pyotr is believed to be the first recorded incident where psychiatry was used in Russia to suppress dissent.

Living under house arrest following his declaration of insanity, Chaadayev next work was entitled, fittingly, "Apologie d'un Fou" [which has been translated as "Apology of a Madman" but may better be translated as "Apologia of a Madman"] (1837).  It opens with a quote from Samuel Coleridge stating "O my brethren!  I have told/ Most bitter truth, but without bitterness." 
In this brilliant but uncompleted work he maintained that Russia must follow her inner lines of development if she was to be true to her historical mission.

His ideas influenced both the Westernizers (who supported bringing Russia into accord with developments in Europe by way of various degrees of liberal reform) and Slavophiles (who supported Russian Orthodoxy and national culture.)

Most of his works have been edited by his biographer, Mikhail Gershenzon (two volumes, Moscow, 1913–14), whose study of the philosopher was published at St. Petersburg in 1908.

References

Sources
This article incorporates text from the New International Encyclopedia, a work which is now in the public domain.
 lazov, Yuri. "Chaadaev and Russia's destiny." Studies in East European Thought 32.4 (1986): 281-301.
 McNally, Raymond T. "The Significance of Chaadayev's Weltanschauung." Russian Review 23.4 (1964): 352-361. online
 M.A. Mendosa, Uno scrittore russo del primo ’800: Pëtr Jakovlevič Čaadaev, Mantova: Universitas Studiorum, 2014,

External links
 "Philosophical Letters", by P. Chaadayev at Runivers.ru in Djvu and PDF format
 "Philosophical Letters", by P. Chaadayev.
 "LETTRES PHILOSOPHIQUES ADRESSÉES À UNE DAME". P. Ja. Tchaadaev.
   Principales ideas de la Carta filosófica a una dama, de Piotr Chaadaev

1794 births
1856 deaths
Writers from Moscow
People from Moskovsky Uyezd
Russian people of Tatar descent
Russian nobility
Decembrists
Moscow State University alumni
19th-century philosophers from the Russian Empire